W.H. Croxford High School is a high school in Airdrie, Alberta, Canada. The school is under the administration of Rocky View School Division.

Programs, courses, and clubs 
The school courses include culinary arts, band, mathematics, science, language arts, and cosmetology. The school also offers a drama class, which includes theatre acts. Clubs offered to students include a gaming club, literacy club, mountain biking club, and a gay-straight alliance club.

Athletics 
The school's sports include football, volleyball, basketball, soccer, badminton, cross country, and track and field. The team name of the school is the Croxford Cavaliers.

References

External links 

 Official website

Airdrie, Alberta
High schools in Alberta